Stracin or Stratsin is a village  in the municipality of Kratovo, North Macedonia.

Demographics
According to the 2002 census, the village had a total of 185 inhabitants. Ethnic groups in the village include:

Macedonians 183
Serbs 2

External links

References

Villages in Kratovo Municipality